Stephan Gerber (born 27 August 1980) is a South African rugby union player, currently playing with the . His regular position is lock or flanker.

Career

At the end of 2008, he joined French Rugby Pro D2 side Aurillac. He remained with them until the end of the 2012–13 season, making a hundred appearances.

In 2013, he returned to South Africa and joined East London-based side  for the 2013 Currie Cup First Division season.

References

South African rugby union players
Living people
1980 births
Rugby union players from Durban
Border Bulldogs players
Griquas (rugby union) players
Leopards (rugby union) players
Pumas (Currie Cup) players
Rugby union locks